Protasovo is a rural locality (a village) in Botanovskoye Rural Settlement, Mezhdurechensky District, Vologda Oblast, Russia. The population was 30 as of 2002.

Geography 
Protasovo is located 33 km southwest of Shuyskoye (the district's administrative centre) by road. Shetenevo is the nearest rural locality.

References 

Rural localities in Mezhdurechensky District, Vologda Oblast